Edouard Joseph (born 24 December 1989) is a Haitian Olympic weightlifter. He represented his country at the 2016 Summer Olympics in the Men's 62 kg event, where he did not finish. Joseph was the first Olympic weightlifter for Haiti in over 50 years. He won the bronze medal in the clean & jerk at the 2014 Pan American Weightlifting Championships.

Major results

References 

1989 births
Living people
Haitian male weightlifters
Weightlifters at the 2016 Summer Olympics
Olympic weightlifters of Haiti
Weightlifters at the 2015 Pan American Games
Pan American Games competitors for Haiti